Williams' mud turtle (Pelusios williamsi) is a species of turtle in the family Pelomedusidae. The species is endemic to Africa.

Etymology
The specific name, williamsi, is in honor of American herpetologist Ernest E. Williams.

Geographic range
Pelusios williamsi is found in the Democratic Republic of the Congo, Kenya, Tanzania, and Uganda.

Subspecies
P. w. williamsi  - Lake Victoria mud turtle
P. w. laurenti  - Ukerewe Island mud turtle
P. w. lutescens  - Albert Nile mud turtle

References

Bibliography

Further reading
Bour R (1984). "Note sur Pelusios williamsi Laurent, 1965 (Chelonii, Pelomedusinae) ". Revue Française d'Aquariologie 11: 27–32. (Pelusios williamsi laurenti, new subspecies). (in French).
Laurent RF (1965). "A Contribution to the Knowledge of the Genus Pelusios (Wagler)". Annales de Musée Royal de l'Afrique Centrale, Sciences Zoologiques, Tervuren, Belgium, Eighth Series (135): 1-33. (Pelusios williamsi, new species, p. 12; P. w. lutescens, new subspecies, p. 16).

Williams' mud turtle
Reptiles of the Democratic Republic of the Congo
Reptiles of Kenya
Reptiles of Tanzania
Reptiles of Uganda
Williams' mud turtle